State of Emergency 2 is a 2006 third-person shooter video game developed by DC Studios and released exclusively for the PlayStation 2. It is the sequel to 2002's State of Emergency and takes place four years after the first game. It features more game modes and an enhanced engine. State of Emergency 2 was being developed by VIS Entertainment for Rockstar Games, but the title was continued by SouthPeak Interactive with developer DC Studios.

Reception 

The game received "unfavorable" reviews according to video game review aggregator Metacritic.

References

External links 

2006 video games
PlayStation 2 games
PlayStation 2-only games
SouthPeak Games
Single-player video games
Third-person shooters
Video games developed in the United Kingdom
DC Studios games